The 2003 Wimbledon Championships was a tennis tournament played on grass courts at the All England Lawn Tennis and Croquet Club in Wimbledon, London in the United Kingdom. It was the 117th edition of the Wimbledon Championships and were held from 23 June to 6 July 2003. It was the third Grand Slam tennis event of the year.

Lleyton Hewitt was unsuccessful in his 2002 title defence, being upset in the first round by Grand Slam debutant Ivo Karlović. It was the first time in the Open Era history of Wimbledon that a defending champion had lost in the first round, the second time overall. This Wimbledon was notable for being Roger Federer's first grand slam victory when he defeated Mark Philippoussis in the final.  This would be the first of five consecutive Wimbledon titles for Federer, and eight overall.	
Serena Williams successfully defended her 2002 title, defeating her sister Venus in the final for the second consecutive year.

Media coverage
Broadcast coverage of the 2003 Championships was distributed to 159 territories worldwide and the tournament received more than 5,717 hours of coverage. This was an increase of 565 hours from the 2002 figure and surpassed all previous records for the event. The BBC transmitted 160 hours of coverage in the United Kingdom on BBC One and BBC Two. The official Championships website www.wimbledon.org received 242 million page views and 4.3 million visitors.

Prior to the start of the 2003 Championships, the  All England Lawn Tennis and Croquet Club announced that it would begin purchasing insurance cover that would allow the club to cover losses in the event that a future tournament would be canceled as a result of a pandemic; this policy was announced in the wake of the SARS outbreak and required the club to pay £1.6 million per year.

Prize money
The total prize money for 2003 championships was £9,373,990. The winner of the men's title earned £575,000 while the women's singles champion earned £535,000.

* per team

Champions

Seniors

Men's singles

 Roger Federer defeated  Mark Philippoussis, 7–6(7–5), 6–2, 7–6(7–3) 
It was Federer's 5th title of the year, and his 9th overall. It was his 1st career Grand Slam title. He became the first Swiss male player to win a Grand Slam singles title. It was the first, in what was to become 5 consecutive Wimbledon titles, and 8 overall. It was also the first Grand Slam title of the 20 won by Federer through the course of his career, a joint second place for the most Grand Slam singles titles in the history of the men's game.

Women's singles

 Serena Williams defeated  Venus Williams, 4–6, 6–4, 6–2 
It was Serena's 4th title of the year, and her 23rd overall. It was her 6th career Grand Slam title, and her 2nd at Wimbledon.

Men's doubles

 Jonas Björkman /  Todd Woodbridge defeated  Mahesh Bhupathi /  Max Mirnyi, 3–6, 6–3, 7–6(7–4), 6–3

Women's doubles

 Kim Clijsters /  Ai Sugiyama defeated  Virginia Ruano Pascual /  Paola Suárez, 6–4, 6–4

Mixed doubles

 Leander Paes /  Martina Navratilova defeated  Andy Ram /  Anastasia Rodionova, 6–3, 6–3

Juniors

Boys' singles

 Florin Mergea defeated  Chris Guccione, 6–2, 7–6(7–3)

Girls' singles

 Kirsten Flipkens defeated  Anna Chakvetadze, 6–4, 3–6, 6–3

Boys' doubles

 Florin Mergea /  Horia Tecău defeated  Adam Feeney /  Chris Guccione, 7–6(7–4), 7–5

Girls' doubles

 Alisa Kleybanova /  Sania Mirza defeated  Kateřina Böhmová /  Michaëlla Krajicek, 2–6, 6–3, 6–2

Singles seeds

Men's singles
  Lleyton Hewitt (first round, lost to Ivo Karlović)
  Andre Agassi (fourth round, lost to Mark Philippoussis)
  Juan Carlos Ferrero (fourth round, lost to Sébastien Grosjean)
  Roger Federer (champion)
  Andy Roddick (semifinals, lost to Roger Federer)
  David Nalbandian (fourth round, lost to Tim Henman)
  Guillermo Coria (first round, lost to Olivier Rochus)
  Sjeng Schalken (quarterfinals, lost to Roger Federer)
  Rainer Schüttler (fourth round, lost to Sjeng Schalken)
  Tim Henman (quarterfinals, lost to  Sébastien Grosjean)
  Jiří Novák (third round, lost to Alexander Popp)
  Paradorn Srichaphan (fourth round, lost to Andy Roddick)
  Sébastien Grosjean (semifinals, lost to Mark Philippoussis)
  Xavier Malisse (first round, lost to Cyril Saulnier)
  Arnaud Clément (second round, lost to Justin Gimelstob)
  Mikhail Youzhny (second round, lost to Feliciano López)
  Gustavo Kuerten (second round, lost to Todd Martin)
  Marat Safin (withdrew due to injury)
  Fernando González (first round, lost to Jürgen Melzer)
  Yevgeny Kafelnikov (first round, lost to Raemon Sluiter)
  Martin Verkerk (first round, lost to Robin Söderling)
  Félix Mantilla (first round, lost to Frédéric Niemeyer)
  Agustín Calleri (second round, lost to Flávio Saretta)
  Albert Costa (withdrew due to injury)
  Tommy Robredo (third round, lost to Andy Roddick)
  James Blake (second round, lost to Sargis Sargsian)
  Younes El Aynaoui (third round, lost to Andre Agassi)
  Wayne Ferreira (first round, lost to Karol Kučera)
  Gastón Gaudio (first round, lost to Mardy Fish)
  Jarkko Nieminen (third round, lost to Olivier Rochus)
  Vince Spadea (first round, lost to Max Mirnyi)
  Juan Ignacio Chela (second round, lost to Victor Hănescu)
  Nikolay Davydenko (first round, lost to Lee Childs)
  Àlex Corretja (withdrew due to personal reasons)
  Radek Štěpánek (third round, lost to Mark Philippoussis)

Women's singles
  Serena Williams (champion)
  Kim Clijsters (semifinals, lost to Venus Williams)
  Justine Henin-Hardenne (semifinals, lost to Serena Williams)
  Venus Williams (final, lost to Serena Williams)
  Lindsay Davenport (quarterfinals, lost to Venus Williams)
  Amélie Mauresmo (withdrew due to injury)
  Chanda Rubin (third round, lost to Silvia Farina Elia)
  Jennifer Capriati (quarterfinals, lost to Serena Williams)
  Daniela Hantuchová (second round, lost to Shinobu Asagoe)
  Anastasia Myskina (fourth round, lost to Jennifer Capriati)
  Jelena Dokić (third round, lost to Maria Sharapova)
  Magdalena Maleeva (second round, lost to Paola Suárez)
  Ai Sugiyama (fourth round, lost to Kim Clijsters)
  Eleni Daniilidou (second round, lost to Mary Pierce)
  Elena Dementieva (fourth round, lost to Serena Williams)
  Vera Zvonareva (fourth round, lost to Venus Williams)
  Amanda Coetzer (second round, lost to Francesca Schiavone)
  Conchita Martínez (third round, lost to Anastasia Myskina)
  Meghann Shaughnessy (first round, lost to Anikó Kapros)
  Patty Schnyder (first round, lost to Petra Mandula)
  Elena Bovina (second round, lost to Maria Sharapova)
  Nathalie Dechy (third round, lost to Ai Sugiyama)
  Lisa Raymond (third round, lost to Mary Pierce)
  Magüi Serna (second round, lost to Maja Matevžič)
  Anna Pistolesi (first round, lost to Samantha Reeves)
  Alexandra Stevenson (first round, lost to Émilie Loit)
  Silvia Farina Elia (quarterfinals, lost to Kim Clijsters)
  Laura Granville (third round, lost to Serena Williams)
  Nadia Petrova (third round, lost to Venus Williams)
  Denisa Chládková (second round, lost to Cara Black)
  Elena Likhovtseva (second round, lost to Alicia Molik)
  Tamarine Tanasugarn (first round, lost to Akiko Morigami)
  Svetlana Kuznetsova (quarterfinals, lost to Justine Henin-Hardenne)

References

External links
 Official Wimbledon Championships website

 
Wimbledon Championships
Wimbledon Championships
Wimbledon Championships
Wimbledon Championships